The 1825 to 1863 Stockton and Darlington Railway (S&DR) was world's first public railway to use steam locomotives, its first line connected collieries near Shildon with Stockton-on-Tees and Darlington, and was officially opened on 27 September 1825. While coal waggons were hauled by steam locomotives from the start, passengers were carried in coaches drawn by horses until carriages hauled by steam locomotives were introduced in 1833.

The company was taken over by the North Eastern Railway in 1863, transferring  of line and about 160 locomotives, but continued to operate independently as the Darlington Section until 1876. The opening of the S&DR was seen as proof of the effectiveness of steam railways and its anniversary was celebrated in 1875, 1925 and 1975. Much of the original route is now served by the Tees Valley Line, operated by Northern.

Locomotives were sometimes renumbered, and the old numbers re-used for new locomotives. The following list does not include all renumberings.

Disposal
When the North Eastern Railway (NER) took over the Stockton and Darlington Railway (SDR) in 1863, the SDR stock included 157 locomotives. The SDR locomotives were administered by a separate committee until 1873.  The SDR locomotives were renumbered in 1873, mostly by the addition of 1000.  In September 1875 there were still 55 SDR locomotives in existence.

See also
 Darlington Works
 Locomotives of the North Eastern Railway

References

 
Stockton and Darlington
British railway-related lists
Stockton and Darlington Railway